Lemo may refer to:

People
 Sani Umar Rijiyar Lemo (born 1970), Nigerian scholar
 Tunde Lemo, Nigerian banker
 Zita Lemo, Austrian table tennis player

Places
 Lemo or Limo (woreda), Ethiopia
 Lemo or Lemu, Finland
 Morón Air Base, Spain (by ICAO code)

Other
 Battle of Lemo
 LeMO, virtual museum
 LEMO, Swiss manufacturer